Richard Rouse (26 February 177410 May 1852) was an Anglo-Australian public servant who was active during the Colonial development of New South Wales as the Superintendent of Public Works and Convicts at Parramatta under the direction of NSW Governors William Bligh and Lachlan Macquarie.

Biography
Rouse was born in Oxfordshire, England in 1774. He arrived in Sydney in December 1801 as a free settler with his wife, Elizabeth Adams, and their two young children. In July 1805 he was appointed superintendent of lumberyard at Parramatta.

In 1806 Rouse welcomed Governor Bligh against the despotism of the New South Wales Corps and was one of the governor's staunchest supporters. After sympathizing with Bligh, he was named by Bligh as one of the witnesses he wished to take to England. However, the trip did not eventuate as Bligh changed his mind. Rouse his position as a public servant. On 14 January 1810 he was appointed superintendent of carpenters by Governor Macquarie and in October 1814 was appointed auctioneer at Parramatta.

On 8 October 1816 Rouse was granted  near the site of the Castle Hill convict rebellion; at the suggestion of Macquarie the grant was named Rouse Hill. The actual possession of the land had taken place a few years previously, as the Sydney Gazette had first mentioned Rouse Hill on 27 November 1813, and the homestead was begun soon afterwards. It took a few years to build and was a two-storey, twenty-two room house, which has been occupied by members of the Rouse family ever since.

Both properties prospered and the Rouses were connected with progressive movements in the towns of Mudgee and Gulgong for many years. There he devoted his time to the raising of sheep and cattle, the breeding of thoroughbred horses and the management of his various properties. He became well known for the quality of his stock, which he improved from time to time with imported sires.

Rouse was a devoted family man, a loyal member of the Church of England, a hard-working and honest public servant and a very efficient grazier.

Elizabeth Rouse died in December 1849 and Richard Rouse died on 10 May 1852. He was buried in a vault at St Peter's Church, Richmond.

One of his grandsons was Richard Rouse who served as the Member for Mudgee between 1876 and 1877; and in 1879.

See also

History of Sydney
Rouse Hill House

References

1774 births
1852 deaths
19th-century Australian public servants